The Queensland Curriculum and Assessment Authority (QCAA) is a statutory authority of the Queensland Government responsible for the development and appropriate delivery of kindergarten, primary, and secondary education in Queensland, Australia. The authority itself does not operate any educational institutions, but creates, amends and certifies syllabuses, issues Queensland Certificates of Education, and regulates assessment.

QCAA Board 
The QCAA Board is a seven-member caucus of education leaders, and is the governing body for the authority. The board's seven positions are filled by three education sector leaders (each from the state, Catholic, and independent sectors) and four members appointed by the minister for education. The founding Education (Queensland Curriculum and Assessment Authority) Act 2014 explains that the minister can only appoint people "having the qualifications, experience or standing the Minister considers relevant to the functions of the authority."

As of 24 September 2020, the board's seven positions are filled by:

 Brian Short, ministerial appointment (chair)
 Tony Cook, representing the Department of Education
 David Robertson, representing Independent Schools Queensland
 Lee-Anne Perry, representing the Queensland Catholic Education Commission
 Doune Macdonald, ministerial appointment
 Carol Nicoll, ministerial appointment
 Cresta Richardson, ministerial appointment

Footnotes

References

External links
 

Education in Queensland